Seven Hours of Gunfire is a 1965 Spanish-Italian Spaghetti Western film directed by Joaquín Luis Romero Marchent (as José Hernandez).

Cast
Rik Van Nutter as Buffalo Bill (as Clyde Rogers)
Adrian Hoven as Wild Bill Hickok
Kurt Großkurth as August Mai
 as Cora
Gloria Milland as Calamity Jane
Robert Johnson Jr.
Carlos Romero Marchent
Helga Liné
Alfonso Rojas as Colonel Carr
Antonio Molino Rojo
Francisco Sanz as Pastor Lieberman
Raf Baldassarre as Guillermo
Cris Huerta as Steve
María Esther Vázquez as Agnese

External links 
 

1965 films
1965 Western (genre) films
Spaghetti Western films
Spanish Western (genre) films
Italian Western (genre) films
West German films
1960s Spanish-language films
Films directed by Joaquín Luis Romero Marchent
Films with screenplays by Joaquín Luis Romero Marchent
Films scored by Angelo Francesco Lavagnino
1960s Italian films
1960s Spanish films